William Wells (15 March 1818 – 1 May 1889) was an English Liberal Party politician who sat in the House of Commons from 1852 to 1857 and from 1868 to 1874.

Wells was the son of Captain William Wells, R.N. and his wife Lady Elizabeth Proby, daughter of John Proby, 1st Earl of Carysfort, and grandson of Vice-Admiral Thomas Wells, of Holme, whose father, William, had inherited the estate from his wife's uncle, Thomas Truman, in 1768. He was educated at Harrow School and at Balliol College, Oxford, and served in the 1st Life Guards from 1839 until 1843. In 1826 he inherited Holmewood Hall in Huntingdonshire from his father. He also inherited the Redleaf estate in Kent from his great-uncle William.

He was a J.P. and a Deputy Lieutenant for Kent and Huntingdonshire.

At the 1852 general election Wells was elected as a member of parliament (MP) for the borough of Beverley.
He held the seat until his defeat in the 1857 by the Liberal Edward Glover.
An election petition was lodged by Wells on the grounds that Glover was not duly qualified,
because he did not meet the property-holding requirements.
The issue had been raised during the election, and handbills circulated to that effect, but Glover had denied the allegations. On 3 August 1853, the committee ruled that Glover had not been duly qualified, and that his election was void.
A by-election was held on 11 August 1853, when Wells stood again, but was defeated by the Conservative candidate Henry Edwards.

Wells contested the City of Peterborough at the 1852 general election, where he was the third-placed of the three Liberal candidates. He won the seat at the 1868 general election,
defeating the Liberal MP Thomson Hankey, a former Governor of the Bank of England. Wells remained an MP for Peterborough and held the seat until the 1874 general election, when he did not stand again.

He was appointed High Sheriff of Cambridgeshire and Huntingdonshire for 1875. He was also a keen agriculturalist and President of the Royal Agricultural Society in 1880.

Wells died at the age of 71. He had married Lady Louisa Wemyss-Charteris, the daughter of the Francis Wemyss-Charteris, 9th Earl of Wemyss in 1854. They had no children.

References

External links
 

1818 births
1889 deaths
People educated at Harrow School
Alumni of Balliol College, Oxford
Liberal Party (UK) MPs for English constituencies
UK MPs 1852–1857
UK MPs 1868–1874
Politics of Peterborough
British Life Guards officers
Deputy Lieutenants of Kent
Deputy Lieutenants of Huntingdonshire
High Sheriffs of Cambridgeshire and Huntingdonshire